James Patrick Mullins (5 January 1874 – 26 November 1965) was a Liberal party member of the House of Commons of Canada and served as mayor of Bromptonville at one time. He was born in Saint-Mathias, Quebec and became an insurance agent by career.

He was first elected to Parliament at the Richmond—Wolfe riding in the 1935 general election and re-elected in 1940 and 1945. He did not stand for re-election in 1949.

References

External links
 

1874 births
1965 deaths
Liberal Party of Canada MPs
Members of the House of Commons of Canada from Quebec
Mayors of places in Quebec